Quercus verde is a species of oak endemic to northeastern Mexico.

Description
Quercus verde is a shrub or small tree, growing up to 3 meters high.

Range and habitat
Quercus verde is endemic to the western slope of the Sierra Madre Oriental in Nuevo León, where it is found between 2,100 and 2,500 meters elevation.

Conservation
Little is known about the population of the species, or threats to it.

References

Endemic oaks of Mexico
Flora of the Sierra Madre Oriental
Trees of Nuevo León
Trees of Northeastern Mexico
edwardsiae
Plants described in 1936